Julian Myron Brown (born November 3, 1969) is an American former professional basketball player. At 6'3" (1.90 m), 180 lb (82 kg) shooting guard, he played one season in the National Basketball Association (NBA) before playing around the world.

College career
During his high school career with Sto-Rox, he was overlooked by most of the major colleges and universities in the Tri-State area.
Brown went on to become a four-year starter (1987–91) for the Slippery Rock. He was a four times All-American and finished his college career as Slippery Rock's all-time leading scorer.

Professional career
Brown was selected by the Minnesota Timberwolves in the 2nd round (34th pick overall) of the 1991 NBA draft. He played in the NBA with the Timberwolves for only one season (1991/92), appearing in 4 games. He was featured in the dunk of the week section of NBA Inside Stuff.

Brown was picked up by the CBA's Fort Wayne Fury when he was released by the Minnesota Timberwolves after the season. During Brown's stint with the Fury (1991–1997) he won two dunk contests in 1991–92 and 1993–94, the first player in CBA history to win twice. He also made an appearance in the 96/97 CBA All-Star game, scoring 10 points on his first All-Star appearance.

Career statistics

NBA

Source

Regular season

|-
|1991–92||Minnesota||4||0||5.8||.667||.333||–||.8||1.5||.3||.0||2.3
|}

References

External links

Myron Brown  Retrieved 11 August 2015

1969 births
Living people
American expatriate basketball people in Brazil
American expatriate basketball people in Italy
American expatriate basketball people in Venezuela
American men's basketball players
Basket Livorno players
Basketball players from Pennsylvania
Fort Wayne Fury players
Lega Basket Serie A players
Minnesota Timberwolves draft picks
Minnesota Timberwolves players
People from McKees Rocks, Pennsylvania
Point guards
Scaligera Basket Verona players
Sioux Falls Skyforce (CBA) players
Slippery Rock men's basketball players
Sportspeople from the Pittsburgh metropolitan area
Trotamundos B.B.C. players
Victoria Libertas Pallacanestro players